Brisa Hennessy (born September 16, 1999) is a Costa Rican professional surfer who competes in the World Surf League.

In 2019, Hennessy's standing in the WSL qualified her to represent Costa Rica for Surfing at the 2020 Summer Olympics in Tokyo, Japan.  The Tokyo Olympics marked the first instance for surfing to be recognised as an Olympic sport.

Early life 
When she was three years old, Hennessy stood up on her first wave. She was born on the Osa Peninsula of Costa Rica, where both of her parents ran a surf school. Hennessy lived in Costa Rica until the age of nine when she moved to Oahu to pursue a professional surfing career.  She also spent summers in Fiji, giving her exposure to some of the best conditions the sport has to offer at a young age. Brisa still lives somewhat of a nomadic lifestyle to this day, traveling from place to place wherever her career takes her. She does not have a permanent residence.

Career Victories

Professional career 
Hennessy qualified for the World Surf League Championship Tour in 2018 at the age of just 18. She became the first Costa Rican to qualify for the tour.  She recorded her highest finish ever at the WSL Corona Bali Protected event in 2019, where she took home third place at the annual event.  2019 proved to be a breakout campaign for the young Costa Rican surfer with seven Top 10 finishes throughout the season.

In December 2019, Hennessy's standing on the WTC Championship Tour earned her direct qualification to the Tokyo Summer Olympics. She was one of the final two surfers to qualify for the games through the WSL.

Hennessy's qualification for Tokyo 2020 marked a milestone for Costa Rican athletes. She became the first Central American surfer to earn a spot in the Olympic Games as well as just the fifth Costa Rican athlete to qualify for any competition in Tokyo.  In a 2019 interview with the International Surfing Association, she said that bringing a medal home to her homeland of Costa Rica would give her “goosebumps.”

When the COVID-19 pandemic struck in March 2019, Hennessy relocated to Fiji to live with her parents who had recently established a permanent home on the remote island.

She is represented professionally by Athelo Group, a sports agency based out of Stamford, Connecticut.

Veganism 

Outside of surfing, Hennessy enjoys cooking. She is a plant-based athlete who started her own YouTube channel during the pandemic to share her vegan recipes with fans and followers.

References 

1999 births
Living people
Costa Rican surfers
World Surf League surfers
Surfers at the 2020 Summer Olympics
Olympic surfers of Costa Rica
People from Puntarenas Province